Nadezhda Ryashkina (born January 22, 1967, in Sokol, Vologda Oblast) is a retired female race walker from Russia. She set the world record in the women's 10 km race walk event on July 25, 1990, clocking 41:56.23, in Seattle at the 1990 Goodwill Games. Ryashkina equalled Liu Hongyu's world record in the 20 km event with a total time of 1:27:30, set on February 7, 1999, in Adler, Russia.

International competitions

References

1967 births
Living people
People from Sokol, Vologda Oblast
Sportspeople from Vologda Oblast
Russian female racewalkers
Goodwill Games medalists in athletics
Competitors at the 1998 Goodwill Games
Competitors at the 1994 Goodwill Games
Competitors at the 1990 Goodwill Games
Russian Athletics Championships winners
World record setters in athletics (track and field)
World Athletics record holders